Stenolechia zelosaris is a moth of the family Gelechiidae. It is found in India (Assam).

The wingspan is about 10 mm. The forewings are grey speckled darker and with an oblique wedge-shaped spot of darker suffusion on the costa beyond the middle. The plical stigma is distinct, black and terminated by a small whitish dot. The hindwings are grey.

References

Moths described in 1923
Stenolechia